

Nauru at the 1994 Commonwealth Games was abbreviated NRU.

The 1994 Games in Victoria, British Columbia, Canada marked Nauru's second participation in the Commonwealth Games. The small country was represented by three athletes: weightlifter Marcus Stephen, weightlifter Gerard Jones, and runner Frederick Cannon.

Stephen, who later became his country's President in 2007, won three gold medals. He had previously won a gold and two silvers in the 1990 Games. He would go on to win three gold in 1998, and three silver in 2002.

Medals

Medalists

Gold
Marcus Stephen — Weightlifting, Men's Bantamweight Combined
Marcus Stephen — Weightlifting, Men's Bantamweight Snatch
Marcus Stephen — Weightlifting, Men's Bantamweight Clean and Jerk

Silver
none

Bronze
none

References

Nauru at the Commonwealth Games
Nations at the 1994 Commonwealth Games
1994 in Nauruan sport